American singer and songwriter Tiffany Evans has released one studio album, three extended plays/mixtapes, thirteen singles and twelve music videos. Evans appeared on Star Search in February 2003, where she won the Grand Champion title in junior singer division. She competed against fellow singers Lisa Tucker and David Archuleta, who both later appeared on American Idol. In the same year she signed to Columbia Records. 

In 2004, Tiffany released her debut self-titled EP Tiffany Evans. The EP featured eight tracks on CD (all covers) and a special bonus DVD. Its main single "Let Me Be Your Angel" (originally recorded by Stacy Lattisaw) was released on September 7, 2004, along with a music video. The song debuted at number 95 on the Billboard Hot 100. She released her self-titled debut album in April 2008. It featured her most successful single to date, "Promise Ring" (featuring Ciara), as well as "I'm Grown" (featuring Bow Wow). The album peaked at number four on the US Top Heatseekers chart. The third single from the album, "Lay Back & Chill" was planned, but Evans instead started to work on her second album. 

In 2010, she released new single, entitled "I'll Be There" from her unreleased second album Pefrect Imperfection. In the same year, she left Columbia and started her own independent record label Little Lady Entertainment (later renamed as Live Love Entertainment). In 2012, she announced new project and released two singles: "U Got a Woman" and "If You Love Me". 

On February 12, 2013 she released new EP/mixtape titled 143, produced by Sak Pase, B.Fre$h, Elijah Blake, Watch the Duck, Maad Scientist and Trak Girl. On November 3, 2014 she released new single "Baby Don't Go", which debuted at number three on Billboards Trending 140 chart. Her third EP, All Me, was released in October 2015.

Studio albums

EPs

Singles

Music videos

Notes

References

Discographies of American artists
Rhythm and blues discographies
Hip hop discographies